The 2012 Rochdale Council election took place on 3 May 2012 to elect members of Rochdale Metropolitan Borough Council in the North West, England. This was on the same day as other 2012 United Kingdom local elections. The Labour Party won 17 of the 20 seats with 53% of the vote, with the other three going to the Conservative Party with 27% of the vote. The Liberal Democrats lost all 11 of their seats up for re-election with 15% of the vote. This election marked the return to the council of former Leaders Richard Farnell and Allen Brett. It also produced Rochdale's youngest ever councillor in Liam O'Rourke.

These results also led to the resignation of local Liberal Democrat leader Wera Hobhouse.

After the election, the composition of the council was:
Labour 42
Conservative 13
Liberal Democrat 5

Election result

Ward results

Balderstone & Kirkholt ward

Bamford ward

Castleton ward

Central Rochdale ward

East Middleton ward

Healey ward

Hopwood Hall ward

Kingsway ward

Littleborough Lakeside ward

In 2008 Peter Evans stood in this ward as a Liberal Democrat.

Milkstone & Deeplish ward
In 2008, Mohammad Sharif stood in this ward for the Liberal Democrats.

Milnrow & Newhey ward

Norden ward

North Heywood ward

North Middleton ward

Maureen Rowbothan stood for the ward in 2008 as a Labour candidate.

Smallbridge & Firgrove ward

Jean Ashworth stood for the ward in 2008 as a Liberal Democrat.

South Middleton ward

Spotland & Falinge ward

Wardle & West Littleborough ward

West Heywood ward

West Middleton ward

References

2012 English local elections
2012
2010s in Greater Manchester